The 1971 Vanderbilt Commodores football team represented Vanderbilt University in the 1971 NCAA University Division football season. The Commodores were led by head coach Bill Pace in his fifth season and finished the season with a record of four wins, six losses and one tie (4–6–1 overall, 1–5 in the SEC).

Schedule

References

Vanderbilt
Vanderbilt Commodores football seasons
Vanderbilt Commodores football